Germanus III may refer to:

 Germanus III of Constantinople, Ecumenical Patriarch in 1266
 Germanos III of Old Patras (1771–1826)